Mount Nestor is a  mountain summit located in Kananaskis Country in the Canadian Rockies of Alberta, Canada. It is named after , a destroyer sunk in the Battle of Jutland during World War I. Mount Nestor is situated at the south end of the Goat Range along the west shore of Spray Lakes Reservoir. Nestor's east flank is  within Spray Valley Provincial Park, while the west aspect is within Banff National Park, with the boundary line between the two parks running roughly north-to-south over its summit. The nearest higher peak is Old Goat Mountain,  to the north. Mount Nestor can be seen from Alberta Highway 742, the Smith-Dorrien/Spray Trail.

History

The first ascent of the mountain was made in 1913 by the Interprovincial Boundary Commission. The mountain's name was officially adopted in 1922 by the Geographical Names Board of Canada.

Geology

Mount Nestor is composed of sedimentary rock laid down during the Precambrian to Jurassic periods. Formed in shallow seas, this sedimentary rock was pushed east and over the top of younger rock during the Laramide orogeny.

Climate

Based on the Köppen climate classification, Mount Nestor is located in a subarctic climate with cold, snowy winters, and mild summers. Precipitation runoff from the mountain drains into the Spray Lakes Reservoir.

See also
 List of mountains of Canada

References

External links

Weather forecast for Mount Nestor Mountain Forecast
Spray Valley Provincial Park Alberta Parks
Banff National Park National Park Service

Nestor
Nestor
Nestor